Megachile dakotensis is a species of bee in the family Megachilidae that inhabits the Midwestern United States.

References
http://explorer.natureserve.org/servlet/NatureServe?searchName=Megachile+dakotensis

dakotensis
Insects described in 1926